Arthur Ninnis Breckon (1887–1965) was New Zealand-born photojournalist. Breckon was the first person from New Zealand to be published in Life Magazine, with his photo of a tuatara.

Breckon's press photography captured the conflict and tension present in early 20th century New Zealand. Most notably, Breckon captured the police attack on Maungapohatu in April 1916. This event resulted in Rua Kenana and some of his followers made to stand trial for sedition. He was the only photographer present at the time.

Another important moment that Breckon captured in photographs was the expedition of Douglas Mawson to the sub Antarctic Macquarie Islands. The crew were running low on food supplies so a rescue mission was despatched. This mission, which Breckon was a part of, ran into trouble of its own when their landing boat capsized in the surf. Breckon and the team struggled to shore in the icy cold water to eventually make their way to Mawson's men. Breckon photos captured much of the wildlife on the islands.

Other honourable mentions in Breckon's work was his photographs of the wreckage site of the SS Wiltshire off Great Barrier in 1922 and pictures of the Napier earthquake.

Breckon had also photographed both the First and Second New Zealand Expeditionary Forces before their deployment to war.

David Eggleton describes, "Breckon's on the spot reportage was a demonstration of photography as a form of social control, serving to isolate, classify and document anomalous behaviour for everyone's edification."

References

External links
 Works of Breckon are held in the collection of Auckland War Memorial Museum Tāmaki Paenga Hira

1887 births
1965 deaths
New Zealand photographers